Michael Klingler (born 6 February 1983 in Grabs, St. Gallen) is a Swiss-born Liechtensteiner bobsledder who has competed since 2003. At the 2010 Winter Olympics in Vancouver, he crashed out in the two-man event and withdrew from the four-man event.

Klingler's best overall finish was fourth in a two-man event in a lesser event at Lake Placid, New York in December 2009.

References 
 Michael Klingler profile at NBC Olympics
 
 

1983 births
Bobsledders at the 2010 Winter Olympics
Liechtenstein male bobsledders
Living people
Olympic bobsledders of Liechtenstein